Calyptocarpus vialis is a species of flowering plant in the family Asteraceae. Common names for C. vialis include straggler daisy, horseherb, lawnflower, and creeping Cinderella-weed. It is native to south Texas, Mexico, Belize, Venezuela, and the Caribbean. It has also been introduced east of Texas, Argentina, Hawaii, India, Java, Australia, and Taiwan. It is one of only three species in the genus Calyptocarpus.

It flowers year round. It is a weedy species, found in lawns and along other disturbed areas such as roadsides and paths.

References

Heliantheae